Iraklion Air Station was a United States Air Force  facility located   east of the city of Iraklion near the village of Gournes, in the north central section of the Greek island of Crete.

History

Major commands to which assigned
Detachment 2, 34 Radio Squadron Mobile, USAFSS, 1953–1955
 United States Air Forces in Europe, 1954–1979
 U.S. Air Force Electronic Security Command, 1979–1991
 Air Force Intelligence Command, 1991–1993

Major units assigned
 Det 2, 34th Radio Squadron Mobile, USAFSS 1953–1955
 Det 1, 1603d Air Transport Wing (MATS), 1 October 1954 – January 1966
 6938th Radio Squadron Mobile (RSM), April 1955
 7222d Air Base Squadron, 1 August 1955 – 1 January 1958
 Det 1, 7206th Spt Group, 1 January 1958
 6930th Radio Group, Mobile (RGM) (6931st Scty Gp), 1 April 1958 – 1 July 1963
 Redesignated: 6931st Security Group (SG) 1 July 1963-1 October 1978
 6931st Security Squadron (SS), 1 July 1974 – 1 October 1979
 Redesignated: 6931st Electronic Security Squadron (ESS), 1 October 1979-30 September 1993
 7276th Air Base Group, 1 October 1978 – 30 June 1994
 2115th Communications Squadron, 2 March 1979 – 30 September 1993
 USAF Hospital Iraklion 1954-1993

Operational history
A non-flying facility, Iraklion Air Station (Iraklion AS) began operations in support of activities of the  1603rd Air Transport Wing and other USAFE liaison operations in Crete beginning on 5 October 1954.  The base also supported units of USAFSS, USAFE and NATO as directed.  The base provided administrative and logistical support to the 6931st Electronic Security Squadron, as well as policy guidance in administrative, logistical and support matters for all regular and other tenant organizations at Iraklion AS, and as well as other dispersed U.S. Department of Defense units located on the island of Crete from October 1, 1978, until the closure of the base in 1994. Iraklion AS also provided liaison and base support services for the Embassy of the United States, Athens.

Since the station's closure in 1994, the facility has been abandoned and appears to have been looted and vandalized.  It is in an unkempt state being taken over by weeds. Currently, an aquarium known as the Cretaquarium, a dinosaur park and an animal shelter are housed at the site.

Future
In 2020, it was reported that the United States and Greece were considering the reactivation of the station as a base for U.S. Air Force combat and strategic assets, in lieu of Incirlik Air Base in Turkey.

References
 Ravenstein, Charles A. (1984). Air Force Combat Wings Lineage and Honors Histories 1947–1977. Maxwell AFB, Alabama: Office of Air Force History. .
 Erwin H. Lerner, former A/2C, stationed at facility 1954–1955, serving as cryptographer in Detachment 2, 34th Radio Squadron Mobile, United States Air Force Security Service.

External links
 6931st Security Group — Iraklion AS, Crete, Greece (July 1967 to August 1969) — Fotos & Documents
 Link to various Virtual Buildings of the Iraklion Air Station

Military installations of the United States in Greece
Buildings and structures in Heraklion (regional unit)
Stations of the United States Air Force
Military installations closed in 1994
1954 establishments in Greece
1994 disestablishments in Greece